This is a list of some notable Spanish-speaking people. In alphabetical order within categories.

Actors 
 Victoria Abril (born 1959)
 Norma Aleandro (born 1936)
 Héctor Alterio (born 1929)
 Elena Anaya (born 1975)
  Imperio Argentina (1906–2003)
 Moises Arias (born 1994)
 Pedro Armendáriz (1912–1963)
 Pedro Armendáriz Jr. (born 1940)
 Antonio Banderas (born 1960)
 Javier Bardem (born 1969)
  Juan Diego Botto (born 1975)
 Cantinflas (1911–1993)
 Nestor Carbonell (born 1968)
 Verónica Castro (born 1952)
 Penélope Cruz (born 1974)
 Carla Diaz (born 1990)
 Chico Díaz (born 1959)
 Fernando Fernán Gómez (born 1921)
 Andy García (born 1956)
 Gael García Bernal (born 1978)
 Sancho Gracia (born 1936)
 Salma Hayek (born 1966)
 Pedro Infante (1917–1957)
 Raúl Juliá (1940–1994)
 Katy Jurado (1924–2002)
  Libertad Lamarque (1908–2000)
 John Leguizamo (born 1964)
 George Lopez (born 1961)
 Eva Longoria (born 1975)
 Diego Luna (born 1979)
 Federico Luppi (born 1936)
 Cheech Marin (born 1946)
 Eva Mendes (born 1974)
 Jordi Mollá (born 1968)
 Ricardo Montalbán (1921–2009)
 Sara Montiel (born 1928)
 Paul Naschy (born 1934)
 Jorge Negrete (1911–1953)
 Elizabeth Peña (1961–2014)
 Francisco Rabal (1926–2001)
 Fernando Rey (1917–1994)
 Jean Reno (born 1948)
 Dolores del Río (1904–1983)
 Michelle Rodríguez (born 1978)
 Benicio del Toro (born 1967)
 Leonor Varela (born 1972)
 Paz Vega (born 1976)
 Natalia Verbeke (born 1975)
 Zoe Saldana (born 1978)

Authors 
See also List of Spanish language authors (by country).

A-D 
  Juan Ruiz de Alarcón (c. 1581–1639), dramatist.
 Rafael Alberti (1902–1999), poet, Cervantes Prize Laureate (1983).
 Vicente Aleixandre (1888–1984), poet, Nobel Prize Laureate (1977).
  Isabel Allende (born 1942), best selling novelist.
 Dámaso Alonso (1898–1990), poet, Cervantes Prize Laureate (1978).
 José María Arguedas (1911–1969), novelist.
 Roberto Arlt (1900–1942), short-story writer, novelist, and playwright.
 Miguel Ángel Asturias (1899–1974), Nobel Prize Laureate (1967).
 Juan Tomás Ávila Laurel (born 1966), writer and dissident.
 Francisco Ayala (1906–2009), novelist, Cervantes Prize Laureate (1991).
 Azorín (José Martínez Ruiz) (1863–1967), journalist, poet, novelist and essayist.
 Jesús Balmori (1887–1948), journalist, poet, novelist.
 Pío Baroja (1872–1956), novelist.
 Gustavo Adolfo Bécquer (1836–1870), romantic poet and tale writer.
  Andrés Bello (1781–1865), humanist, poet, lawmaker, philosopher and educator.
 Jacinto Benavente (1866–1954), dramatist, Nobel Prize Laureate (1922).
 Mario Benedetti (born 1920), novelist and poet.
 Adolfo Bioy Casares (1914–1999), novelist, Cervantes Prize Laureate (1990).
 Vicente Blasco Ibáñez (1867–1928), best-selling novelist, wrote The Four Horsemen of the Apocalypse (1916).
 Roberto Bolaño (1953–2003), novelist, Rómulo Gallegos Prize Laureate (1999).
 Jorge Luis Borges (1899–1986), Cervantes Prize Laureate (1979).
 Alfredo Bryce Echenique (born 1939), novelist and short stories writer.
 Antonio Buero Vallejo (1916–2000), playwright.
 Mario Bunge (born 1919), philosopher, author of the Treatise on Basic Philosophy (8 volumes, 1974–1989).
 Guillermo Cabrera Infante (1929–2005), novelist, essayist, translator, and critic, Cervantes Prize Laureate (1997).
 Pedro Calderón de la Barca (1600–1681), playwright and poet.
 Miguel Antonio Caro (1843–1909), humanist.
 Alejo Carpentier (1904–1980), novelist and essay writer, Cervantes Prize Laureate (1977).
 Camilo José Cela (1916–2002), novelist, Nobel Prize (1989) and Cervantes Prize Laureate (1995).
 Miguel de Cervantes (1547–1616), novelist, playwright and poet, author of Don Quixote (1605 and 1615).
 Julio Cortázar (1914–1984), novelist and short stories writer.
  Sor Juana Inés de la Cruz (1648/1651–1695), poet and dramatist.
 Rubén Darío (1867–1916), modernist poet.
 Virgilio Dávila (1869–1943), poet.
 Miguel Delibes (born 1920), novelist, Cervantes Prize Laureate (1993).
 Nelson Denis (born 1954), screenwriter, novelist.
 Gerardo Diego (1896–1987), poet, Cervantes Prize Laureate (1979).

E-H 
 José Echegaray (1832–1916), dramatist, Nobel Prize Laureate (1904).
 Jorge Edwards (born 1931), Cervantes Prize Laureate (1999).
 Laura Esquivel (born 1950), novelist.
 Leandro Fernández de Moratín (1760–1828), dramatist and neoclassical poet.
 Rosario Ferré (born 1938), poet and essayist.
 Carlos Fuentes (1928-2012), novelist and essayist, Rómulo Gallegos (1977), Cervantes (1987) and Prince of Asturias (1994) awards Laureate.
 Benito Pérez Galdós (1843–1920), novelist.
 Rómulo Gallegos (1884–1969), novelist.
 Federico García Lorca (1898–1936), poet and dramatist.
 Gabriel García Márquez (1928-2014), novelist and journalist, Nobel Prize Laureate (1982).
 Luis de Góngora (1561–1627), lyric poet.
 Baltasar Gracián (1601–1658), author of El Criticón, influenced European philosophers such as Schopenhauer.
 Jorge Guillén (1893–1984), poet, Cervantes Prize Laureate (1976).
 Nicolás Guillén (1902–1989), poet.
 José Hernández (1834–1886), poet and journalist, author of the epic poem Martín Fierro.
 Vicente Huidobro (1893–1948), poet, initiator of the Creacionismo movement.

I-L 
 Juan Ramón Jiménez (1881–1958), poet, Nobel Prize Laureate (1956).
 John of the Cross (1542–1591), mystic poet.
 Demetrio Korsi (1899–1957), poet, diplomatic, journalist. 
 Enrique Krauze (born 1947), historian, political and social essayist and publisher.
 Mariano José de Larra (1809–1837), literary journalist.
 José Lezama Lima (1910–1976), novelist.
 Luis Lloréns Torres (1878–1944), poet.
 Luis López Nieves (born 1950), best-selling novelist and tale writer.
 Dulce María Loynaz (1902–1997), poet, Cervantes Prize Laureate (1992).
 Leopoldo Lugones (1874–1938), poet.
 Fray Luis de León (1527–1591), poet of the Spanish Golden Age.

M-P 
 Antonio Machado (1875–1939), poet.
 Julián Marías (1914–2005), philosopher and essayist.
 Javier Marías (born 1951), novelist and translator, Rómulo Gallegos Prize Laureate (1995).
 José Martí (1853–1895), poet and essayist.
 Gabriela Mistral (1889–1957), poet, Nobel Prize Laureate (1945).
 Augusto Monterroso (1921–2003), short stories writer, Prince of Asturias Award Laureate (2000).
 Agustín Moreto y Cavana (1618–1661), dramatist and playwright.
 Manuel Mujica Láinez (1910–1984), novelist, essayist, journalist and short stories writer; author of Bomarzo (1962).
 Álvaro Mutis (born 1923), Cervantes Prize (2001) and Prince of Asturias Awards Laureate (1997).
 Pablo Neruda (1904–1973), poet, Nobel Prize Laureate (1971).
 Amado Nervo (1870–1919), modernist poet.
 Juan Carlos Onetti (1909–1994), novelist and short-story writer, Cervantes Prize Laureate (1980).
 José Ortega y Gasset (1883–1955), philosopher and essayist.
 Fernando del Paso (born 1935), novelist, essayist and poet, Rómulo Gallegos Prize Laureate (1982).
 Octavio Paz (1914–1998), Cervantes Prize (1981) and Nobel Prize (1990) Laureate.
 Arturo Pérez-Reverte (born 1952), best-selling novelist and journalist.
 Sergio Pitol (born 1933), novelist, short stories writer and translator, Cervantes Prize Laureate (2005).
 Elena Poniatowska (born 1932), novelist.
 Manuel Puig (1932–1990), novelist, author of The Kiss of the Spider Woman (1976).

Q-T 
 Francisco de Quevedo (1580–1645), novelist, essayist and poet, master of Conceptism.
 Horacio Quiroga (1878–1937), short story writer.
 José Eustasio Rivera (1888–1928), poet and novelist.
 José Rizal (1861–1896), poet, novelist and essayist.
 Augusto Roa Bastos (1917–2005), novelist, Cervantes Prize Laureate (1989).
 Fernando de Rojas (1465–1541), novelist, author of La Celestina (1499).
 Gonzalo Rojas (born 1917), poet, Cervantes Prize Laureate (2003).
 Juan Ruiz (c. 1283 – c. 1350), author of the epic poem Book of Good Love.
 Juan Rulfo (1917–1986), novelist, Prince of Asturias Award Laureate (1983).
 Ernesto Sabato (born 1911), novelist and essay writer, Cervantes Prize Laureate (1984).
 Jaime Sabines (1926–1999), poet.
 Pedro Salinas (1891–1951), poet.
 Alfonsina Storni (1892–1938), postmodernist poet.
 Saint Teresa of Avila (1515–1582), mystic poet.
 Tirso de Molina (1571–1648), playwright.

U-Z 
 Francisco Umbral (born 1935), novelist, biographer and essayist, Cervantes Prize Laureate (2000).
 Miguel de Unamuno (1864–1931), existentialist author and essayist.
 Arturo Uslar-Pietri (1906–2001), novelist, Prince of Asturias Award Laureate (1990).
 Ramón María del Valle-Inclán (1866–1936), dramatist, novelist and member of the Generation of 98.
 César Vallejo (1892–1938), poet.
 Fernando Vallejo (born 1942), novelist, Rómulo Gallegos Prize Laureate (2003).
 Mario Vargas Llosa (born 1936), novelist and essayist, Cervantes Prize Laureate (1994).
 José Vasconcelos (1882–1959), thinker, educator and essayist.
 Garcilaso de la Vega (1501–1536), poet.
  "El Inca" Garcilaso de la Vega (1539–1616), first mestizo author in Spanish language.
 Félix Lope de Vega (1562–1635), poet and playwright.
 Xavier Villaurrutia (1903–1950), poet.
 Gabriel Zaid (born 1934), poet and essayist.
 María de Zayas y Sotomayor (1590–1660), novelist.
 José Zorrilla y Moral (1817–1893), poet and dramatist, author of Don Juan Tenorio (1844).

Film directors 

 Pedro Almodóvar (born 1949)
  Alejandro Amenábar (born 1972)
 Alfonso Arau (born 1932)
 Adolfo Aristarain (born 1943)
 Icíar Bollaín (born 1967)
  Luis Buñuel (1900–1983)
 Alfonso Cuarón (born 1961)
 José Luis Cuerda (born 1947)
 Nelson Denis (born 1954)
 Juan Downey (born 1947)
 Víctor Erice (born 1940)
 José Luis Garci (born 1944)
 Luis García Berlanga (born 1921)
 Alejandro González Iñárritu (born 1963)
 Alexandro Jodorowsky (born 1929)
 León Klimovsky (1906–1996)
 Bigas Luna (1946–2013)
 Julio Médem (born 1958)
 Paul Naschy (born 1934)
 Franco de Peña (born 1966)
 Arturo Ripstein (born 1943)
 Carlos Saura (born 1932)
 Guillermo del Toro (born 1964)

Journalists 
 Enrique Gratas, television journalist.
 Jorge L. Ramos (born 1950), television journalist; three-time Emmy Award winner.
 Jacobo Zabludovsky (born 1928), television journalist.

Linguists 
  Andrés Bello (1781–1865), philologist.
 Miguel Antonio Caro (1843–1909), linguist.
 Rufino José Cuervo (1844–1911), philologist and linguist.
 María Moliner (1900–1981), lexicographer.
 Antonio de Nebrija (1441–1522), scholar, published the first grammar of the Spanish language (Gramática Castellana, 1492), which was the first grammar produced of any Romance language.

Singers and songwriters 
See also Spanish language rock and roll (by country).
 Lucecita Benitez (born 1940), singer-songwriter.
 Nydia Caro (born 1955), singer.
 Pilita Corrales (born 1939), singer.
 Celia Cruz (1926–2003), salsa singer.
 Gloria Estefan (born 1957), singer-songwriter.
 José Feliciano (born 1945), singer-songwriter.
 Luis Fonsi (born 1978), singer.
 Juan Gabriel (born 1950), ranchera and ballad singer-songwriter.
 Manolo García (born 1955), singer-songwriter.
 Carlos Gardel (1890–1935), tango singer born in France, raised in Argentina.
 Juan Luis Guerra (born 1957), merengue  and bachata  singer.
 Julio Iglesias (born 1943), pop singer.
 Pedro Infante (1917–1957)
 Víctor Jara (1932–1973), singer-songwriter.
 José Alfredo Jiménez (1926–1973), singer-songwriter.
 Juanes (born 1972), singer-songwriter.
 Agustín Lara (1900–1970), singer and songwriter.
 Laura Pausini (born 1974), singer and songwriter.
 Ernesto Lecuona (1896–1963), songwriter.
 Marc Anthony (born 1969), singer-songwriter.
 Ednita Nazario (born 1955)
 Jorge Negrete (1911–1953)
 Pitbull (born 1981), pop singer.
 Jose Alfredo Jimenez (1926–1973)
 Nino Bravo (1944–1973)
 Raphael (born 1943), pop singer.
 Joaquín Sabina (born 1949), singer-songwriter.
 Alejandro Sanz (born 1968), pop/ballad singer.
 Selena (1971–1995), pop singer.
 Joan Manuel Serrat (born 1943), singer-songwriter.
 Shakira (born 1977), Latin Pop singer and songwriter.
 Enrique Urquijo (1960–1999), New wave music singer.
 Atahualpa Yupanqui (1908–1992), folk musician.

See also 
List of arabophones
List of people by nationality

Lists of people by language
Spanish-language lists
Hispanidad